Histoire du mouvement anarchiste en France (1800–1914) is a 1951 history book of the anarchist movement in France by Jean Maitron.

Bibliography 

 
 
 
 
 
 
 

1951 non-fiction books
French-language books
History books about anarchism
Anarchism in France